Bathycrinus aldrichianus is a species of sea lily, a crinoid in the family Bathycrinidae. It is native to deep water in the North Atlantic Ocean. It was first described by the Scottish marine zoologist Charles Wyville Thomson (who had been chief scientist on the Challenger Expedition) and named in honour of Pelham Aldrich, a British naval officer and explorer. It is believed to be the crinoid living at the greatest depth.

Description

Bathycrinus aldrichianus is a ten-armed sea lily, the first and second arms, the fourth and fifth, and the seventh and eighth having syzygies (being joined together at the base). The arms are connected to the base ring of the crown and consist of a series of jointed rectangular plates with ribs on the exterior surface. The stem usually has twelve or more columnals (stem portions) but sometimes has rather fewer, with a minimum of five. It is attached to the substrate by elongated, jointed cylindrical plates that spread out in a rootlike fashion.

Distribution

Behaviour
Because of the great depths at which this crinoid lives, its behaviour has been little studied. When observed from a submersible, the roots were immersed in the sediment, the lower two thirds of the stem were held vertically and the upper third curved and the arms opened to form a filtration fan held perpendicular to the substrate and often slightly reflexed. The oral disc was oriented down-current.

References 

Bourgueticrinida
Animals described in 1876
Fauna of the Atlantic Ocean